Islamic neo-traditionalism is a contemporary strand of Sunni Islam that emphasizes adherence to the four principal Sunni schools of law (madhahib), belief in one of the Ash'ari, Maturidi and Athari schools of theology and the practice of tasawuff (Sufism), which its followers consider to be representative of the classical Sunni tradition.

Beliefs 
Islamic neo-traditionalists believe Islam fundamentally consists of three concepts defined in the Hadith of Gabriel: islam, iman & ihsan. These are believed to correspond to the fields of fiqh, aqidah and tasawuff (Sufism) within the Islamic intellectual tradition respectively. Fiqh is regarded as being delineated by the Shafiʽi, Hanafi, Maliki and Hanbali schools of law, aqidah by the Ash'ari, Maturidi, and Athari schools of theology, and Sufism (generally by tariqas). The orthodox understanding of the religion is therefore thought to lie with the scholars of these fields who possess an unbroken scholarly lineage or chain of transmission (isnad) to their classical authorities, which ultimately end with Muhammad. A scholar's authoritativeness is judged by whether he has been issued an ijazah by his teachers, which lists their scholarly chain and grants him a license to teach on its authority. Also a huge emphasis of the movement is based around Al-Ghazali's teachings and his Ihya.  

Neo-traditionalists argue against the position that strict adherence (taqlid) to a school of law is unnecessary, claiming that it implies previous generations of Sunni Muslims were mistaken in their understanding of Islam, that it is impossible to derive correct rulings without relying on a school's legal principles, and that it will lead to laypeople making ijtihad, thereby irreversibly disrupting Sunni legal unity and introducing new practices to the religion. However unlike other traditionalists, neo-traditionalists are open to the renewal of fiqh and the reopening of ijtihad to combat new challenges in the contemporary world muslims now live in. Neo-traditionalism overlaps with modernism in its core emphasis and promotion of "Maqasid al-Sharia" (Objectives of Islamic law), Fiqh al-Aqalliyat (minority jurisprudence), etc. amongst contemporary Muslims facing the day-to-day challenges of modernity.

History

Western neo-traditionalism 
Islamic neo-traditionalism emerged in the West during the 1990s following the return of several Muslim scholars who had studied at 'traditional' centres of Islamic learning in the Arab world, including Hamza Yusuf, Abdal Hakim Murad, Nuh Keller and Umar Faruq Abdullah, who intended to disseminate the 'traditional' knowledge they had learned throughout their communities. Western Islamic neo-traditionalism is characterised by isolated spiritual retreats during which neo-traditionalist scholars, seen as a living link to the 'authentic' Sunni tradition, instruct their students known as 'seekers of sacred knowledge'. Critiques of modernity are prevalent in the movement, which is held responsible for spiritual decay, the decline of Islamic metaphysics and the rise of 'reformist' Islamist and liberal movements. Western neo-traditionalists have established their own religious educational institutes, including Zaytuna College, Cambridge Muslim College and the online Islamic seminary SeekersGuidance.

Arab Spring 
Following the Arab Spring, some neo-traditionalist scholars adopted a counter-revolutionary politically quietist stance citing the prohibition of resistance against ruling authorities by a number of pre-modern Sunni jurists and concerns that political upheaval would empower Islamist groups such as the Muslim Brotherhood. Their subsequent alliance with the governments of the United Arab Emirates and Egypt, and their silence towards or outright approval of their actions, attracted criticism, particularly the conduct of Ali Gomaa and Hamza Yusuf after the August 2013 Rabaa massacre.  

However other neo-traditionalist scholars such as Muhammed al-Yaqoubi openly advocated for the removal of dictators such as Bashr Al-Assad.

Contemporary adherents 
Muslim scholars in the Arab world that have been described as neo-traditionalist include Gibril Haddad, al-Yaqoubi, Abdallah bin Bayyah, Ali Gomaa,   Ramadan al-Bouti, Ahmad al-Tayyeb,Ali Al-Jifri and Habib Omar. The Lebanese Sufi movement Al-Ahbash has also been described as neo-traditionalist.

The need for Islamic Revival 
Fauzi Abdul Hamid of the Middle East Institute wrote: 

"Contrary in a way to the stereotypical picture of traditionalists, who cling to the 'closing of the gates of ijtihad (independent reasoning)', neo-traditionalists do not deny the need for and wisdom of dispensing with taqlid (blind imitation) when conditions beckon and are ripe for it. Neo-traditionalists accept the shortcomings of traditionalism that have led to passivity and stagnation, and admit that latter-day Sufis suffer from a perception deficit among the larger Muslim populace as not being down-to-earth enough to problematise the inner malaise of the ummah."

See also 

 Traditionalism (Islam in Indonesia)
 Political quietism in Islam

References 

Sunni Islamic branches